Danilo Pereira (born 1991) is a Portuguese professional footballer.

Danilo Pereira may also refer to:

 Danilo (footballer, born 1986), Brazilian footballer
 Danilo Rios (born 1988), Brazilian footballer
 Danilo (footballer, born 1989) Brazilian footballer
 Danilo (footballer, born 1999), Brazilian footballer